Dr. Jayme M. Filipowicz is an American certified anesthesiologist assistant and former ice hockey defenseman who was an All-American for New Hampshire.

Career
Filipowicz' college career began in 1996 at the University of New Hampshire. His arrival in Durham coincided with the ice hockey team seeing a huge improvement in their performance. In his freshman season, the Wildcats posted a program-record 28 wins, a stark turnaround after finishing with a losing record the year before. It was also the first regular season conference title for UNH in 23 years. Despite the team reaching the Hockey East championship game, Filipowicz' team could only secure a 4-seed in the NCAA Tournament and fell in their first match to defending finalist Colorado College. While the team held serve the following year, Filipowicz say his production increase significantly and he helped the Wildcats reach their first Frozen Four in 16 years. As a junior, Filipowicz nearly tripled his goal output and helped push UNH to heights that the program had never seen before. He led the team's defensive corps in scoring and lifted the team to its first 30-win season. While New Hampshire ultimately fell in the conference title game, they marched through the NCAA Tournament after receiving the 2nd-overall seed and reached the first NCAA championship game in program history. UNH battled conference rival Maine to a draw in regulation and pushed the match into overtime. Unfortunately, the Black Bears were able to secure the winning goal on a broken play and ended the Wildcats' title hopes.

Despite having a year of eligibility left, Filipowicz left UNH in 1999 to sign a professional contract with the Nashville Predators. He was assigned to the Milwaukee Admirals the following year and performed well, leading the team's defense in scoring. After that initial season, however, Filipowicz lost his offensive touch. He remained a highly-regarded defender, however, and spent most of the next five seasons playing AAA-hockey. After helping the Providence Bruins reached the Calder Cup semifinals, Filipowicz headed to Europe for one season before retiring as a player.

With his playing days behind him, Filipowicz returned to college and eventually enrolled at Nova Southeastern University. He graduated with honors in 2013 and became a certified anesthesiologist assistant. He has been working in that field since and, as of 2021, resided in Greenwood Village, Colorado.

Statistics

Regular season and playoffs

Awards and honors

References

External links

1976 births
Living people
AHCA Division I men's ice hockey All-Americans
American men's ice hockey defensemen
Ice hockey people from Illinois
People from Arlington Heights, Illinois
New Hampshire Wildcats men's ice hockey players
Milwaukee Admirals players
Quebec Citadelles players
Saint John Flames players
Richmond Renegades players
Hartford Wolf Pack players
Providence Bruins players
Augsburger Panther players
American anesthesiologists